Tom Gilmore may refer to:

Tom Gilmore (North Carolina politician) (born 1936), American politician in the state of North Carolina
Tom Gilmore Sr. (1908–1994), member of the Australian House of Representatives, 1949–1951
Tom Gilmore Jr. (born 1946), member of the Queensland Legislative Assembly, 1986–1998
Tom Gilmore (ice hockey) (born 1948), ice hockey player for the Edmonton Oilers
Tom Gilmore (property developer) (born 1953), Californian property developer
Tom Gilmore (American football) (born 1964), American football coach and former player
Tom Gilmore (prospector), partner of Felix Pedro
Tom Gilmore (rugby league) (born 1994), rugby league player
Thomas R. Gilmore (1825–1899), American politician in the state of Iowa

See also
 Tommy Joe Gilmore (born 1950), footballer from County Galway